FanX Salt Lake (formerly Salt Lake Comic Con) is a semi-annual multi-genre pop culture expo held in Salt Lake City, Utah, United States. It is produced by Dan Farr and Bryan Brandenburg under Dan Farr Productions and is Utah's most attended convention according to the Governor's Office of Economic Development. The first convention took place at the Salt Palace Convention Center in Salt Lake City. The second event, Salt Lake Comic Con FanXperience, was inaugurated in April 2014.

History
The first Salt Lake Comic Con was held September 5–7, 2013 and included special guests including Adam West, William Shatner, and Stan Lee with attendance over 70,000. People attended with ticket sales that exceeded 50,000. Salt Lake Comic Con FanXperience, the first of two Salt Lake comic conventions in 2014, took place on April 17–19, 2014. FanXperience was attended by over 100,000 people.

On July 25, 2014 San Diego Comic-Con International sent Dan Farr Productions a cease and desist letter over the use of the word "Comic Con."
Convention organizers responded with a press release citing their legal position and unwillingness to comply to the cease and desist letter. In December 2017, a San Diego jury found San Diego Comic-Con does hold a trademark on the term "Comic Con," but also found Salt Lake organizers Dan Farr and Bryan Brandenburg did not willfully or intentionally violate it. They awarded SDCC $20,000 in damages, less than the $12 million the non-profit wanted. Subsequently, Farr and Brandenburg re-branded the convention under the name FanX. On January 16, 2018, Farr and Brandenburg filed a motion for a new trial.

In March 2016, Dan Farr Productions partnered with POP Life to expand FanXperience to Asia. Bryan Brandenburg stepped aside in May 2018 in response to criticism of how he handled a sexual harassment complaint. In 2019, Brandenburg devoted himself full-time to Zenerchi, a biotech company he founded in Salt Lake City.

List of events

See also
 Fandom
 Science fiction convention
 Comic Art Convention

References

External links
 

Multigenre conventions
Comics conventions in the United States
Comics conventions
Festivals in Utah
Tourist attractions in Salt Lake City
Conventions in Utah